Lauren Toyota is a Canadian content producer and author. She originally gained prominence as a television personality. She is currently the host of the Hot for Food blog and YouTube channel.

Toyota was born in Mississauga, Ontario. She earned a diploma in Music Business Administration from Durham College. In 2005, she moved from Toronto to Vancouver to work as a television personality on the lifestyle magazine show 969 on Razer.

Career
Toyota worked as an intern for "SONY BMG" towards a Diploma in Entertainment Administration before landing her opportunity at Razer. She was also the host of Citytv Vancouver's modern global music video show Ethnosonic. She was a MuchMusic VJ based in Vancouver, British Columbia, where she co-hosted and produced the show Going Coastal. Going Coastal had been on MuchMusic since 1986 but was canceled in November 2008.

While working in Vancouver under the CTVglobemedia umbrella, Toyota also acted as the West Coast Correspondent for Fashion Television in addition to producing for other CTVglobemedia specialty channels including SPACE, Bravo, and etalk. She moved back to Toronto, Ontario in 2009 where she worked as a freelance host/interviewer for a number of media outlets including MSN.ca, heavy.com, and BlackBerry/Research In Motion. In 2010, Toyota started at MuchMusic as a host and producer. She was a part of the stations new flagship show, New.Music.Live. In 2012, Lauren started hosting her own show on MuchMusic called Today's Top 10 which aired weeknights at 10pm ET. The show was cancelled in July 2014 as part of the Bell Media layoffs.

In 2012, Toyota hosted the Demi Lovato documentary, Unbroken. She made a guest appearance playing herself on Degrassi during the season twelve episode "Tonight, Tonight (Part Two)", which aired on November 23, 2012.

Lauren was the co-host of After Degrassi on MTV alongside Phoebe Dykstra which was also cancelled in July 2014.

Since late 2014, Toyota has been working as a full-time YouTuber. She owns Hot for Food blog providing vegan recipes and cooking ideas. She also films personal vlogs on her eponymous channel. Toyota is part of Kin Community, a digital media company that promotes female content creators.

Vegan cookbooks

Ten Speed Press, an imprint of Penguin Random House have published two books by Toyota, Vegan Comfort Classics: 101 Recipes To Feed Your Face  and Hot for Food All Day: Easy Recipes to Level up Your Vegan Meals.

Awards and Accolades
In 2007, Toyota was nominated for a Leo Award in the "Best Performance or Host in a Youth or Children's Program or Series" category.

She was named Canada's Most Influential Vegan by IMPACT magazine, in 2017. She also appeared on the cover of the magazine in 2018.

Refinery29 included Toyota in their 2018 list of "Canadian Women Killing It". OptiMYz named her in their list of Top 100 Health and Fitness Influencers of 2019.

References

External links

 
 

Living people
Activists from Ontario
Canadian television hosts
Canadian women television hosts
Canadian people of Japanese descent
Canadian animal rights activists
Canadian veganism activists
People from Mississauga
Vegan cookbook writers
Year of birth missing (living people)